Diana Marcela Velasco Gómez (born January 25, 1985 in Cali) is a judoka from Colombia.

Bio
Diana was born in Cali but she lives and trains in capital city Bogotá. She is member of El salitre judo club.

Judo
Her biggest success is winning gold medal at 2010 South American Games in half-middleweight category.

Achievements

References

External links
 
 Facebook

1985 births
Living people
Colombian female judoka
Judoka at the 2011 Pan American Games
People from Cali
Judoka at the 2015 Pan American Games
South American Games gold medalists for Colombia
South American Games medalists in judo
Competitors at the 2010 South American Games
Pan American Games competitors for Colombia
21st-century Colombian women